Tân Uyên is a rural district of Lai Châu province in the Northwest region of Vietnam. It was established in 2008. Its area come from the southern half of Than Uyên district. As of 2008, the district had a population of 42,221. The district covers an area of 903.27 km². The district capital lies at Tân Uyên.

Communes
Not including the capital, Tân Uyên district has 9 communes:
Mường Khoa
Phúc Khoa
Nậm Sỏ
Nậm Cần
Thân Thuộc
Trung Đồng
Hố Mít
Pắc Ta
Tà Mít

References

Districts of Lai Châu province